Grès was a French haute couture fashion house founded by Madame Grès in 1942. Parfums Grès is the associated perfume house, which still exists, and is now based in Switzerland.

History
Germaine Émilie Krebs (1903–1993), known as Alix Barton and later as "Madame Grès", relaunched her design house under the name Grès in Paris in 1942. Prior to this, she worked as "Alix" or "Alix Grès" during the 1930s. Formally trained as a sculptor, she produced haute couture designs for an array of fashionable women, including the Duchess of Windsor, Marlene Dietrich, Greta Garbo, Jacqueline Kennedy, and Dolores del Río. Her signature was cut-outs on gowns that made exposed skin part of the design, yet still had a classical, sophisticated feel. She was renowned for being the last of the haute couture houses to establish a ready-to-wear line, which she called a "prostitution".

The name Grès was a partial anagram of her husband's first name and alias. He was Serge Czerefkov, a Russian painter, who left her soon after the house's creation. By 2012, the last Grès store in Paris was closed.

Parfums Grès
Grès's signature fragrance was Cabochard, created by Bernard Chant, and launched in 1958. , Cabochard is still being manufactured and retailed. Other perfumes, launched after the sale of the company, include:
 Cabotine (1990)
 Folie Douce (1997)
 Cabaret (2003)
 Caline (2005)
 Caline Night (2006)

References

Biography
 Laurence Benaïm, Madame Grès, Editions Assouline, 1999 (in French)
 Patricia Mears, Madame Grès: Sphinx of Fashion, Yale University Press, 2008

Further reading

Clothing brands of France
Clothing companies established in 1942
Gres, Madame
Gres, Madame
Haute couture
Parfums Gres
French companies established in 1942
Design companies disestablished in 2012
French companies disestablished in 2012